Selinsgrove Hall and Seibert Hall are two historic educational buildings located on the campus of Susquehanna University in Selinsgrove in Snyder County, Pennsylvania. Selinsgrove Hall is a -story brick structure constructed in 1858 in the Italianate style. The roof features a wooden cupola and the structure is featured on the university seal. Seibert Hall is a -story brick structure constructed in 1902 in a restrained Colonial Revival style.

It was listed on the National Register of Historic Places in 1979.

Gallery

See also 
 National Register of Historic Places listings in Snyder County, Pennsylvania

References

External links

School buildings on the National Register of Historic Places in Pennsylvania
National Register of Historic Places in Snyder County, Pennsylvania